Robert Chartham was the pseudonym of Ronald Sydney Seth (5 June 1911 – 1 February 1985), an English writer who used the surname Chartham for his activity as a sexologist and the surname Seth for books about travel and espionage.

As a child Seth was a chorister at Ely Cathedral and a King's Scholar at King's School, Ely. He was educated at Cambridge University.

Appointed Professor of Literature at the University of Tallinn, Estonia, Seth returned to London at the start of World War II, joining the BBC and helping to start the Monitoring Intelligence Bureau. In 1941 he was commissioned into the Royal Air Force and in 1942 joined the Special Operations Executive. Parachuted into Estonia, he was captured by and later defected to the Germans. He was trained by the Sicherheitsdienst (the SS intelligence agency) as an agent for a mission to Britain. He spent most of the rest of the war as an informer in the Oflag 79 prisoner-of-war camp, but in April 1945 was entrusted with a message of peace by Heinrich Himmler (head of the SS), which he carried to London via Switzerland.

Seth's career included teaching and counselling in European universities, lecturing to British university students on "How to Enjoy Sex" and serving as a counsellor in his own London clinic.

He was an editorial consultant to Forum: The International Journal of Human Relations.

During the 1970s, he lived in Malta with his second wife, Barbara McAdam Seth.

Works

as Ronald Seth:
 Baltic Corner: Travel in Estonia, 1939
 A Spy Has No Friends, 1952. Republished 2008 by Barbara Seth, Seth's second wife.
 Secret Servants, a History of Japanese Espionage, 1957
 Operation Retriever, Before 1958
 Operation Lama, Before 1958
 The True Book about the Secret Service, Before 1958
 Operation Ormer, Before 1958
 How Spies Work, Before 1958
 The Spy and the Atom Gun: Introducing Captain Geoffrey Martel of the British Secret Service, 1958
 For My Name's Sake, 1958
 Two Fleets Surprised, 1960
 Anatomy of Spying, 1963
 Forty Years of Soviet Spying, 1965
 Caporetto, 1965
 Russell Pasha, 1966
 The Russian Terrorists, 1967
 The Executioners: The Story of SMERSH, 1967
 The Sleeping Truth: The Hiss-Chambers Affair: the Spy Case that Split a Nation, 1968
 Spies: Their Trade and Their Tricks, 1969
 Encyclopedia of Espionage, 1972
 Jackals of the Reich, 1972

as Dr. Robert Chartham:
 Mainly for Wives, 1963
 Sex Manners for Advanced Lovers, 1969
 The Sensuous Couple, 1971
 Your Sexual Future, 1973

References

External links
 
 

1911 births
1985 deaths
University of Paris alumni
Alumni of the University of Cambridge
British sexologists
British expatriates in France
People educated at King's Ely